Coleophora peisoniella is a moth of the family Coleophoridae. It is found in France, Austria, Slovakia, Hungary, Romania and southern Russia.

The larvae feed on Artemisia maritima. They feed on the generative organs of their host plant.

References

peisoniella
Moths of Europe
Moths described in 1965